Pier47  is a DGNB Gold-certified office building located on the Langelinie Pier in Copenhagen, Denmark.  It was designed by Lundgaard & Tranberg with inspiration from 19th century warehouses. It is owned by ATP Ejendomme.

Construction
The site was acquired by ATP Ejendomme in the 1990s. Lundgaard & Tranberg won first prize in an international competition to design an office building for the site in 2009 but the project was delayed by the financial crisis. Construction began in 2012 and the building was inaugurated in 2016.

Architecture
Pier47 is built in red brick with inspiration from 19th century warehouses such as the nearby Dahlerup Warehouse. The exterior is dominated by the irregularly sized and placed windows. 

The building is centred on a large toplit atrium. The different floors are connected by a system of skyways.

The building has been designed with a focus on sustainable solutions and has been DGNB Gold-certified. Sustainable solutions include natural ventilation and groundwater cooling.

References

External links
 Pier47 at Lundgaard & Tranberg's website

Office buildings in Copenhagen
Office buildings completed in 2015